Pedro Perea (April 22, 1852 – January 11, 1906) was a sheep rancher, politician and banker in the Territory of New Mexico. He served as a delegate to Congress from the Territory of New Mexico (1899 to 1901), after serving three terms on the council of the New Mexico Legislature. He was a younger cousin of Francisco Perea, who also served in Congress from New Mexico.

Early life and education
Pedro Perea was born in Bernalillo, New Mexico to a Hispano Catholic family whose ancestors had been in the area since the colonial era. He went to Santa Fe to attend St. Michael's College, Santa Fe, then equivalent to a boys' seminary. He next studied at Georgetown College, Washington, D.C., soon after it was founded. He graduated from St. Louis College, St. Louis, Missouri, in 1871.

Ranching and politics 
After returning to New Mexico, Perea owned and operated a ranch where he raised agricultural crops and large sheep herd.

He entered politics in his late 30s, being elected as a Republican member of the council of the New Mexico Territorial legislature in 1889, 1891, and 1895. He served as delegate to the Republican National Convention in 1896. He served as president of the First National Bank of Santa Fe in 1890–1894.

Perea was elected in 1898 as a Republican to the Fifty-sixth Congress (March 4, 1899 – March 3, 1901). He did not run for another term.

He engaged in banking and stock raising. Perea was appointed as Territorial insurance commissioner in early 1906, serving days until his death in Bernalillo, New Mexico, on January 11, 1906.

He was interred in the Perea Cemetery (called the "Bernalillo Cemetery" on Google Maps) in Bernalillo, Sandova County, New Mexico.

See also
 List of Hispanic Americans in the United States Congress

Sources

External links 
 

1852 births
1906 deaths
American people of Basque descent
Georgetown University alumni
Members of the New Mexico Territorial Legislature
Delegates to the United States House of Representatives from New Mexico Territory
American politicians of Mexican descent
Hispanic and Latino American members of the United States Congress
Neomexicanos
19th-century American politicians
New Mexico Republicans
People from Sandoval County, New Mexico